The women's lightweight competition in powerlifting at the 2022 World Games took place on 8 July 2022 at the Birmingham Jefferson Convention Complex in Birmingham, United States.

Competition format
A total of 11 athletes entered the competition. Each athlete had 3 attempts in each of 3 events: squat, bench press and deadlift. The athlete with the biggest score in Wilks points is the winner.

Results

References